This is a list of lighthouses in France. It includes the French overseas territories.

Metropolitan France

French Overseas Departments and Territories 
 List of lighthouses in Guadeloupe
 List of lighthouses in French Guiana
 List of lighthouses in Mayotte
 List of lighthouses in Martinique
 List of lighthouses in New Caledonia
 List of lighthouses in French Polynesia
 List of lighthouses in Réunion
 List of lighthouses in Saint Barthélemy
 List of lighthouses in the Collectivity of Saint Martin
 List of lighthouses in Saint Pierre and Miquelon
 List of lighthouses in the French Southern and Antarctic Lands
 List of lighthouses in Wallis and Futuna

French Southern and Antarctic Lands

See also 
 Lists of lighthouses

References

External links 

 lighthousesRus.org (French listing)
 
 Marc de Kleijn: Lighthouses of France

 
 
Lighthouses